Thrall is a fictional character who appears in the Warcraft series of video games by Blizzard Entertainment. Within the series, Thrall is an orc shaman who served for a time as a Warchief of the Horde, one of the major factions of the Warcraft universe, as well as the leader of a shaman faction dedicated to preserving the balance between elemental forces in the world of Azeroth known as the Earthen Ring. Originally introduced in promotional material released by Blizzard Entertainment as the protagonist of the canceled video game Warcraft Adventures: Lord of the Clans, which was co-developed by Blizzard and Animation Magic from 1996 until 1998, Thrall's first proper appearance is in the 2001 novelization of the canceled video game's narrative authored by American novelist Christie Golden. The novel's story is set during his youth, where he is depicted as a slave who was raised by an abusive human military officer, but eventually rebelled and escaped captivity. 

The character's first major appearance is in the 2002 video game Warcraft III: Reign of Chaos, where he acts as the leader of a united Horde. Thrall also appears as a supporting character in the Warcraft III expansion pack The Frozen Throne, as well as the massively multiplayer online role-playing game World of Warcraft and its series of expansions. Thrall's other appearances include sequel novels set in the Warcraft series, and the collectible card game Hearthstone. Thrall is a playable character in the crossover multiplayer online battle arena video game Heroes of the Storm. Chris Metzen, the character's creator, voices Thrall in most media, with the exception of Warcraft Adventures where Clancy Brown was the voice actor, and Hearthstone where he is voiced by Lance Henriksen.

Thrall has been positively well received by players and video game journalists, and is considered one of the most iconic and recognizable characters from the Warcraft franchise.

Character overview
Within series lore, Thrall is the son of Durotan, former chieftain of the Frostwolf Clan, who refused to drink the Blood of Mannoroth and was killed by agents of the orc warlock Gul'dan. Thrall's journey from birth, to slavery as a gladiator and finally his path on the journey to becoming Warchief of the Horde was covered in extensive detail by contributing writers from Joystiq in a recurring series called Know Your Lore. 

Thrall was raised by Aedelas Blackmoore, a self-serving military commander who runs the encampments where the orcs were imprisoned, as his slave. Blackmoore's plans were to raise Thrall to command an orc army to overrun the Alliance, allowing him to forcibly take the position of king. Thrall was trained to handle every weapon and learned battle tactics; he was even forced to compete in many gladiator tournaments that benefit Blackmoore financially following each victory. He also had the opportunity to study basic writing and history. Thrall eventually escapes from Blackmoore with the help of a young human girl named Taretha Foxton. During his captivity, she would sneak notes to Thrall and was considered to be one of his only friends. From Taretha and another character known as Sergeant, Thrall learned mercy, kindness and honor, characteristics that changed him and becomes pivotal to his destiny. Instead of a bloodthirsty tribal leader as Blackmoore had planned, he eventually becomes a leader of compassion and honor. His journey during Lord of the Clans depicts the character as a young inexperienced orc leader who is nevertheless ready to lead his people in peace and understanding, whereas Warcraft III leads Thrall to explore the possibility of diplomacy and peace between Alliance and Horde, though the time between Warcraft III and World of Warcraft sees a tenuous glimpse at a peaceful world shattered.

Development

Thrall was originally developed as the protagonist for the Warcraft Adventures graphic adventure game by series writer Chris Metzen and producer Bill Roper. Thrall was envisioned as an orc who lived his life in human captivity before escaping from his human master. Metzen and his colleagues wanted to present another side to the orcs who are stereotyped as "brutal, savage dudes who use foul language."  Metzen drew comparisons between the orcs of Azeroth and real-life Native American cultures, and the described the former to originally have a "complex culture" which is connected to the land and rooted in shamanism; the goal to show the orcs as the best they can be, yet retaining a "hard edge".  According to Metzen, Thrall's story arc is the "archetypal tale of adventure and discovery" which is directly inspired by the work of Joseph Campbell, in particular the hero's journey. Metzen described Thrall as a traveler through his people's lands yet a stranger to them as he is not raised within an orc culture, and eventually he would meet wiser, more experienced orc characters who recognizes his potential and helps him attain the status to unite the scattered clans of their people.

Although Warcraft Adventures was eventually canceled, Metzen liked Thrall's origin story and wanted to see the concept utilized for another storytelling medium. Christie Golden, the author of Lord of the Clans, recalled that she was given an outline summary of the canceled game's plot, which helps save her time as she usually needs three months to complete a novel and she considered the deadline for Lord of the Clans to be "tight". She would then discuss with Metzen on what parts of the outline would work in a novel, and what should be changed as part of the novelization format. Noting that such cooperation "is unheard of in this line of work", Golden mentioned an example where her request that Thrall's eyes be made blue was granted without hesitation; she reacted with elation when she first saw a preview trailer for the then-upcoming World of Warcraft which properly depicts Thrall's facial features.

Elements of the novel like Taretha, the Sergeant character, and the majority of Blackmoore’s character development were contributions from Golden, who wanted to explore the relationship between Thrall and other human characters to be morally ambiguous. She particularly liked the relationship between Thrall and Taretha and noted that it was very well received by readers. Golden noted that as the overarching plot of Warcraft III requires that several of the races work together in order to stop an otherworldly invasion, the groundwork for it need to be developed in the novel for it to be plausible. On Thrall's relationship dynamics with Aggra, who would eventually become his wife, Golden commented that Thrall is used to dealing with human women such as Taretha and Jaina, and is initially unused to Aggra due to ingrained cultural differences, but gradually learns to value and appreciate her defining traits, namely "her bluntness, and her honesty, and her kind of in-your-face attitude", and in turn he teaches her to respect and value others even if they are not orc by culture or heritage. Golden considers Thrall to be the embodiment of "non-toxic masculinity"

On the relationship between Thrall and his eventual successor as Warchief, Garrosh Hellscream, Golden said she enjoyed writing their interactions and felt that there was a lot of chemistry between the two characters. Golden noted that Garrosh developed into a darker character over time and believed that he has a weak personality at his core, as he was ashamed of his father Grom and needed external validation from Thrall. Golden said Thrall and Garrosh gravitated towards each other, not out of their differences or the notion that opposite attract, but that they were in fact kindred spirits who are fundamentally very similar characters, whose "hearts are wounded and guarded but not closed" in her words.

Thrall's concept design in Heroes of the Storm as a powerful melee fighter was described by the game's Technical Designer John Hodgson as "a prime example of top-down design"; that is, the developmental team started with the "high concept" or "feel" of Thrall as a fantasy character to generate ideas, and then tested and locked down these ideas through the practice of play. His abilities harken back to elements such as his signature large hammer, the character's history as an experienced orc shaman, and the developmental team's own experiences from playing Farseer units in Warcraft III as well as Enhancement Shamans in World of Warcraft. According to Hodgson, the team spent a lot of iteration time trying to figure out which five abilities they could settle Thrall on given the length and breadth of what the character is conceptually capable of within series lore, which are tested against the game's mechanics in identifying what the character needed from a gameplay perspective "in order to feel fun and effective".

Appearances

Lord of the Clans
Thrall's parents, Durotan and Draka, were killed by assassins sent by Gul'dan. Found by Aedelas Blackmoore of Durnholde Keep, Thrall was raised from a young age as a gladiator and trained in many forms of combat. After earning his freedom thanks to Taretha, Thrall escapes Durnholde and set out to find a group of orcs that had evaded Blackmoore. He found these orcs to be those of the Warsong clan, led by Grom Hellscream. After learning some of his history from Grom, Thrall then heads for the mountains of Alterac to find his original clan, the Frostwolves. There he met with their Shaman, Drek'Thar, who taught Thrall the old ways of shamanism in orc culture. There he also met with the orc Warchief Orgrim Doomhammer, and learns more about his past and the reasons for his parents' death. With his new power, and knowledge provided by both Drek'Thar and Doomhammer, Thrall raised an army by freeing his people from the prison encampments, rallying them under the goal of freedom and a return to the orcish life before the war. Doomhammer falls in a battle liberating one of the encampments, and in his final moments, he proclaimed Thrall his successor and the new Warchief of the Horde.

Thrall then launches an attack on the fortress of Durnholde to free all the remaining entrapped orcs at once by cutting off any more reinforcements. He succeeds in taking Durnholde fortress and kills Blackmoore. However, he is too late to save Taretha. At the end of the book, Thrall crushes Durnholde with his elemental powers, then addresses the Horde, promising they will succeed under his leadership. For a time, the Horde traveled throughout Lordaeron, never staying in one location for too long.

Warcraft III
Thrall is plagued by visions from a mysterious prophet, telling him to take the Horde west across the sea. Deciding to learn more about his visions, Thrall eventually meets the prophet, who insists that he must sail across the ocean to Kalimdor. He gathers other orc clans, frees the veteran orc warrior Grom Hellscream, and steal some human ships to sail to Kalimdor. Thrall and a few of the other ships find themselves caught amidst a mighty storm and later finds himself taken captive by a tribe of fish-like creatures known as murlocs to be used as a sacrifice. Thrall is able to break free, but is not able to save fellow captive Sen'jin, leader of the local troll Darkspear tribe and the first to be sacrificed, though the remnants of his tribe join the Horde. Initially introduced in Warcraft: Orcs and Humans as a homogenous alliance of predominantly-orc clans, the Horde is reshaped into a culturally diverse collective of warrior races by this point under Thrall's leadership.

After Horde forces land on the continent of Kalimdor, Thrall witnesses a battle between the centaur and the minotaur-like tauren factions, and he opts to assist the latter. Grateful, the tauren chieftain Cairne Bloodhoof led his clan to join the Horde, and shows Thrall the location of the Oracle that would help the Orcs find their destiny. Thrall travels to the location, which happened to be in Stonetalon Peak, where the prophet later appeared and revealed himself to be Medivh. The latter gave a dire warning about a Burning Legion invasion that would overrun Azeroth, and convinced Thrall that a human faction led by Jaina Proudmoore (who had also heeded Medivh's warnings) and the native night elves would all need to work together to defeat the horrors coming their way. Medivh also informed Thrall that Grom had willingly drank the blood of the demon lord Mannoroth. The combined forces of Thrall and Jaina managed to purge the taint from his body, and Grom later sacrifices himself to slay Mannoroth. Thrall and Jaina's forces fought against Archimonde and the Legion at the base of the mountain, to buy their night elf allies enough time to prepare a trap against Archimonde with their Wisps. Though they succeed in defeating the Legion, the pact between their forces subsequently crumbled. The orcs would go on to build the city of Orgrimmar, and they named the surrounding region Durotar, the former named for Orgrim Doomhammer and the latter named for Durotan.

In the Warcraft III: The Frozen Throne expansion pack, Thrall and Jaina are depicted as attempting to preserve their alliance, though most of their people remain suspicious of each other. Jaina's father Admiral Daelin Proudmoore, who harbors a personal vendetta against the orcs over past defeats as well as the death of his son, later leads a naval force and attacks Orgrimmar to stop the orcs from establishing themselves in the new world. Jaina helps Thrall and Rexxar, the new Champion of the Horde, defeat and eventually kill Admiral Proudmoore.

World of Warcraft
The narrative of World of Warcraft takes place in the years following the aftermath of Admiral Proudmoore's defeat, where several incidents have occurred between the Horde of Orgimmar and the humans of Theramore led by Jaina that jeopardize their uneasy alliance as depicted in the novel World of Warcraft: Cycle of Hatred. The events and characters surrounding the escape of Thrall from the Lord of the Clans novel are depicted In World of Warcraft: The Burning Crusade, where players are sent back in time to assist Thrall's escape and ensure that he is freed, as a new enemy travels through time attempting to stop the rise of the new Horde. Thrall also visits Outland, where he meets the mother of Durotan and his grandmother, Greatmother Geyah, the leader of an orc remnant who were never corrupted by demons known as the Mag'har. Geyah tells him he was meant to be named Go'el, meaning "to redeem" in the orcish language. He also meets Garrosh Hellscream, the Mag'har son of Grom Hellscream, who had given into despair and shame as a result of his father being disgraced because he had been the first to drink Mannoroth's blood. Thrall convinces Garrosh that his father died a hero, and recruits him into the Horde. 

In World of Warcraft: The Shattering, a prelude to World of Warcraft: Cataclysm, Thrall begins to question his place as Warchief and whether or not he truly knows himself at all, though his wife Aggra is quick to reassure and comfort him. During the events of Cataclysm, Thrall stepped down as Warchief in order to focus his attention on his duties as a shaman. Azeroth was shattered as a result of Deathwing's return to the world and the shamans of the Earthen Ring have been put under immense pressure to try to heal the lands. Knowing that the orcs would prefer a strong-willed leader, Thrall reluctantly chooses Garrosh as his successor, hoping the position would instill a sense of responsibility into him. While seeking a way to combat the Cataclysm, Thrall found a mate in the Mag'har orc Aggra, who would later become the mother of his son Durak. 

In World of Warcraft: Mists of Pandaria, Thrall returns to Orgrimmar to join the rebellion against Garrosh, who has become a despotic leader to Thrall's disappointment. In World of Warcraft: Warlords of Draenor, Thrall was among those who followed Khadgar through the Dark Portal. On the alternate version of Draenor, Thrall leads the player character and Horde forces to Frostfire Ridge where he assists in the construction of the Horde Garrison and meets younger incarnations of his parents and family. Thrall helps fight against the Thunderlord clan and the Iron Horde and retakes Frostfire Ridge, but at the cost of his uncles, Ga'nar and Fenris, the latter having joined the Iron Horde. Thrall then aids Khadgar in retaking Shattrath City from the Iron Horde. When Horde and Alliance forces assault the Warsong clan in Nagrand, they battle against Garrosh, who by that time had become the Warsong's Warlord. Thrall intervenes as Garrosh is about to win the battle and challenges him to Mak'gora, a duel to the death. Thrall and Garrosh duel at the Stones of Prophecy, the place where the two had originally met in Outlands. As Garrosh gains an upper hand in the fight, Thrall uses his elemental powers to overpower Garrosh, violating the sacred rules of Mak'gora. Garrosh blames Thrall for who he has become, while Thrall says he had chosen his own destiny before killing Garrosh with a bolt of lightning.

In World of Warcraft: Legion, Thrall fights alongside the Horde forces on the Broken Shore. He sustained heavy injuries before the Horde was overrun and forced to retreat. After almost losing the Doomhammer following the Legion invasion of the Maelstrom, Thrall passed it down to another shaman after he learned he could no longer wield it, nor use his elemental powers as well as he could before killing Garrosh with them on the alternate Draenor.

In  World of Warcraft: Battle for Azeroth,  orc leader Varok Saurfang travels to Thrall's home in Outland to persuade him to return to the Horde, and helps Thrall thwart some assassins who have been deployed by the ruling Horde Warchief Sylvanas Windrunner.

Heroes of the Storm 
Thrall appears as a playable character in the crossover multiplayer video game Heroes of the Storm. His basic traits include a self-healing ability called "Frostwolf Resilience", and has access to abilities such as Chain Lightning, Sundering and Earthquake. Thrall has good crowd control abilities, but is not a very mobile unit and leaves himself vulnerable to attacks whenever he moves backwards while attacking the enemy.

Other appearances 

Like several Warcraft characters, Thrall features as a collectible card in the Warcraft spin-off game Hearthstone. He also appears in the World of Warcraft Trading Card Game as a collectible card.

Thrall appears as an infant in the 2016 Warcraft movie, which is an adaptation of the first Warcraft game and explores the story of Thrall's parents, Durotan and Draka. Duncan Jones, the director of the movie, revealed during a Twitter discussion that he intends to feature Thrall's origin story in a proposed sequel.

Reception
Thrall has received a mostly positive reception from players and video game journalists, and is recognized as one of the most important, popular and well known characters in the Warcraft universe. In a popularity poll organized by Joystiq with the premise of "electing" a prominent Warcraft character as the "Supreme Leader of Azeroth" in 2009, Thrall carried a lead throughout the voting process and ended the race with 55.3 percent of the vote, more than either of his Alliance counterparts combined. CNet staff said they like the character and that despite his "brutal upbringing", Thrall is open to foreign people or cultures, and that the world of Azeroth seems to be relatively peaceful when he is in charge. Regarding Thrall's return to the series as of Battle for Azeroth,  Mike Fahey from Kotaku commented that Thrall has effectively become "Mel Gibson" who is seemingly adjusted to a domesticated lifestyle, but emphasized that it is good to see the character's return. Both Wesley Yin-Poole from Eurogamer and Fraser Brown from PC Gamer welcomed Thrall's return to the series, though Brown noted that Thrall's role as leader of the Horde had already been previously explored.

Staff writers for Know Your Lore generally have a very high regard for the character. Matthew Rossi called him the "single most badass orc out there" and the "savior of the orcish people" who reconnected his people with their original shamanistic beliefs and was willing to listen to Medivh. He noted that even as a player who favors the Alliance faction, he would still have a lot of respect for the character. His colleague Alex Ziebart summarized Thrall as "the best possible leader for the Horde" and that "no one that even comes close to his ability to lead the Horde", though noting that the character's naivety is his most notable flaw; he attempts to foster the old ways of the Horde while pushing them forward at the same time, and he is very trusting of his own people, to the point of putting the wrong people in power because they are a friend of his. Anne Stickney said "Thrall has always been a fascinating character" to her. She observed that Thrall has evolved from his original design in Lord of the Clans as a simple "true hero" with a tragic past, serving as a beacon of honor and integrity in an otherwise savage and violent society, into a deep character who has "several intrinsic flaws" that players could explore as they progress into the overarching narrative of World of Warcraft.

On the other hand, Stickney later provided a detailed criticism of Thrall's role in the rise, fall and death of Garrosh Hellscream, noting that Garrosh would never have the opportunity to cause the amount of death and strife as the warmongering leader of the Horde if Thrall did not fail in his judgment and appointed him as Warchief in the first place. She said that Thrall's biggest failure is his perceived unwillingness to accept responsibility for his mistakes, and that it should have an effect on Thrall's psyche in order to do the end of Garrosh's story arc justice. wondered whether his last words to Garrosh before the latter's death was to try and deflect what he had done, or whether he was just trying to justify his actions to himself. The character has also received some negative reception. Richard Cobbett from Rock, Paper, Shotgun said that Thrall's iteration in Warcraft Adventures is "bland, inappropriately quippy, and just generally stock", and noted that the game lack inspiration on how to make a tough character "into a different kind of adventurer than the usual inventory-packing geek". Ryan Gilliam from Polygon recalled that some World of Warcraft players began pejoratively referring to Thrall as “Green Jesus" following a narrative event where the character stepped down from the role of Warchief to focus his efforts on saving the planet from environmental calamity. 

Thrall's depiction in other media has also received attention. Thrall's characterization in The Shattering as well as Twilight of the Aspects, is on an ongoing quest of self-discovery, has been singled out for praise by Stickney. Yannick LeJacq from Kotaku said he is a longtime Warcraft fan, and found it "unnerving" yet exciting to see a beloved character like Thrall being presented in a game with better graphical quality like Heroes of the Storm, though he expressed a wish to see Thrall and other classic Warcraft characters being represented again within an isometric environment in a new Warcraft real-time strategy game. Ron Amadeo from Ars Technica said he would have preferred if Thrall was featured as the central character of the first ever live-action Warcraft movie adaptation, instead of placing the 2016 movie's setting in the distant past of the series lore where virtually none of the modern fan favorite Warcraft characters were present. He noted that Blizzard's serious world building truly started with Warcraft III in 2002, when fan-favorite characters like Thrall were introduced. Fahey enjoyed Jones’ take on series lore for the 2016 Warcraft film, even where it diverged from what he was familiar with, and looked forward to a sequel where an adult Thrall would be featured as the main character .

References

External links 
Thrall on the official Heroes of the Storm website

Fictional defectors
Fictional hammer fighters
Fictional revolutionaries
Fictional shamans
Fictional slaves in video games
Fictional war veterans
Fictional warlords in video games
Male characters in video games
Orcs
Religious worker characters in video games
Video game characters introduced in 1997
Video game characters who use magic
Warcraft characters